CPED1, or cadherin like and PC-esterase domain containing 1, is a protein that in humans is encoded by the CPED1 gene.

References

Further reading